John Harvey may refer to:

People

Academics
John Harvey (astrologer) (1564–1592), English astrologer and physician
John Harvey (architectural historian) (1911–1997), British architectural historian, who wrote on English Gothic architecture and architects
John Harvey (psychologist) (born 1943), American psychologist
John F. Harvey (John Francis Harvey, 1918–2010), Catholic priest and moral theologian, founder of Courage Apostolate
John T. Harvey (born 1961), English-born American professor of economics at Texas Christian University

The arts and entertainment
John Harvey (actor) (1911–1982), English stage and film actor
John Harvey (American actor) (1917–1970), American actor
Harvey (announcer) (John Harvey, born 1951), American television and radio personality
John Harvey (author) (born 1938), British author of crime fiction
John Harvey (filmmaker), Australian producer, director and screenwriter, co-producer of 2017 TV series  The Warriors
John D. Harvey (born 1968), American horror novelist

Business
John Harvey (ironfounder), partner in Harveys of Hayle, late-18th-century ironfounders, father-in-law of Richard Trevithick
John Anthony Harvey (born 1935), British entrepreneur and logistician

Government and politics
John Harvey (Virginia governor) (died 1646), 17th-century Crown governor of Virginia
John Harvey (Albemarle) (died 1679), Governor of Colonial North Carolina
John Harvey (North Carolina politician) (died 1775), 18th-century Speaker of the North Carolina House of Representatives 
John Harvey (British Army officer) (1778–1852), officer during the War of 1812 and Governor of several Canadian provinces
John Harvey (Australian politician) (1823–1893), politician in the early days of South Australia, founder of the town of Salisbury
John Musgrave Harvey (1865–1940), Australian judge
John Harvey (British politician) (1920–2008), British Conservative MP for Walthamstow East

Military
John Harvey (Royal Navy officer, born 1772) (1772–1837), long serving Royal Navy officer
John Harvey (Royal Navy officer, born 1740) (1740–1794), long serving naval officer killed at the Glorious First of June
John Harvey (RAAF officer) (born 1954), current serving RAAF Air Marshal
John C. Harvey Jr. (born 1951), admiral in the United States Navy

Sports
John Harvey (racing driver) (1938–2020), winner of the 1983 Bathurst 1000
John Harvey (cricketer) (1939–2003), English cricketer
John Harvey (rugby league) (born 1955), Australian rugby league player and coach
John Harvey (American football) (born 1966), National Football League running back
John Harvey (Canadian football) (born 1950), Canadian Football League running back
John Harvey (football manager), manager of Heart of Midlothian F.C. 1966–1970
John Harvey (footballer, fl. 1890–1900), Scottish footballer (Sunderland AFC)
John Harvey (footballer, born 1933), Scottish footballer (Partick Thistle)
John Harvey (cyclist) (1884–?), English cyclist

Ships and boats
SS John Harvey, a 1942 Second World War Liberty ship
John J. Harvey, historic retired New York City fireboat

See also
John Harvie (1742–1807), delegate to the Continental Congress
John Harvie (footballer), Scottish footballer for Falkirk, Clydebank, Johnstone, Dumbarton
John Harvey & Sons, a wine and sherry blending and merchant business founded in Bristol, England in 1796
Sir John Martin-Harvey (1863–1944), British actor
Sir John Harvey-Jones (1924–2008), British businessman, chairman of ICI, then presenter of BBC TV show Troubleshooter
Jonathan Harvey (disambiguation)
Jack Harvey (disambiguation)
John Hervey (disambiguation) (pronounced Harvey)